Lonely Town may refer to:

"Lonely Town" (On the Town), a 1944 song from the musical On the Town, recorded by Frank Sinatra and others
"Lonely Town" (Brandon Flowers song), 2015
"Lonely Town" (Stan Ridgway song) from the album Mosquitos
"Lonely Town", song by Vulfpeck 2018
Lonely Town (album), a 1959 Tommy Flanagan recording